Saeid Chahjouei (born 22 June 1986) is an Iranian football player, currently playing for Kanjanapat in the Thai League 3. He is a Bronze Medalist of 2006 Asian Games with Iran national under-23 football team.

Club career

Statistics

External links
Persian League Profile

Iranian footballers
Esteghlal Ahvaz players
F.C. Aboomoslem players
Fajr Sepasi players
Rah Ahan players
Esteghlal Khuzestan players
1986 births
Living people
Asian Games bronze medalists for Iran
Asian Games medalists in football
Footballers at the 2006 Asian Games
Medalists at the 2006 Asian Games
Association football defenders